The canton of Molsheim is an administrative division of the Bas-Rhin department, northeastern France. Its borders were modified at the French canton reorganisation which came into effect in March 2015. Its seat is in Molsheim.

It consists of the following communes:

Altorf
Avolsheim
Bergbieten
Bischoffsheim
Bœrsch
Dachstein
Dahlenheim
Dangolsheim
Dorlisheim
Duppigheim
Duttlenheim
Ergersheim
Ernolsheim-Bruche
Flexbourg
Grendelbruch
Griesheim-près-Molsheim
Innenheim
Kirchheim
Marlenheim
Mollkirch
Molsheim
Nordheim
Odratzheim
Ottrott
Rosenwiller
Rosheim
Saint-Nabor
Scharrachbergheim-Irmstett
Soultz-les-Bains
Wangen
Wolxheim

References

Cantons of Bas-Rhin